Global Open Data for Agriculture and Nutrition (GODAN) is an initiative that seeks to "support global efforts to make agricultural and nutritionally relevant data available, accessible, and usable for unrestricted use worldwide. The initiative focuses on building high-level policy as well as public and private institutional support for open data."

The initiative was launched in 2013, one year after the G8 summit in 2012 where G-8 leaders "committed to the New Alliance for Food Security and Nutrition as the next phase of a shared commitment to achieving global food security."

According to the Open Data Institute, farmers and other stakeholders on the agriculture supply chain can make more informed decisions resulting in improved yields and efficiency – from farm to fork, when they have free access to useful information on agriculture and nutrition.

Partners 

GODAN and its partners aim to support the open data revolution and hosted the 2016 GODAN summit in New York in September. GODAN has over 400 partners from government, international and private organisations around the world. In the bid to support the open data revolution, the UK Department for Environment, Food and Rural Affairs made over 8,000 data sets available for free use in June 2015.

In 2021, GODAN became a member of Global Waste Cleaning Network (GWCN).

Secretariat 

The GODAN secretariat has been hosted by CABI in Wallingford, UK since 2014. Its research and partnerships offices are based in Wageningen, Netherlands and Rome, Italy.

Resources and financing 

"The GODAN Secretariat states that it has an estimated five year budget of $8.5 million, with five full time employees. GODAN also states that its activities and Secretariat are financially supported by the US Government, the UK Department for International Development (maximum of £2.5 over 5 years), the Government of the Netherlands, the UN Food and Agriculture Organization (FAO), Technical Centre for Agricultural and Rural Cooperation ACP-EU (CTA), Global Forum on Agricultural Research (GFAR), The Open Data Institute (ODI), the Consultative Group for International Agricultural Research (CGIAR) and the CABI."

Governance 

The GODAN Secretariat is governed by a group of GODAN partners including the US Government, the UK's DFID, the Netherlands Government, the Open Data Institute, FAO, CTA, CABI, CGIAR and GFAR.

Activities

GODAN Summit 2016 

In September 2016, GODAN held a two-day summit in New York described as “the largest event of its kind”, with the aim of raising awareness of the call for making agricultural and nutrition data open. The event featured high profile guests including then U.S. Agriculture Secretary Tom Vilsack and Willy Bett, Kenyan Minister of Agriculture, Livestock, and Fisheries.

References

External links 
 
 Open Data Institute 
 Centre for Agriculture and Bioscience International

Non-profit organisations based in the United Kingdom
Agricultural databases
Organisations based in Oxfordshire